Rameez Junaid and Philipp Marx were the defending champions; however, they chose not to participate this year.
Rik de Voest and Lu Yen-hsun defeated 6–3, 6–4 Robin Haase and Igor Sijsling in the final.

Seeds

Draw

Draw

References
 Main Draw

Status Athens Open - Doubles
2010 Doubles